Bolje jedno vruće pivo nego četiri 'ladna (trans. One Warm Beer is Better than Four Cold Ones) is a live album released in 2004 by Montenegrin-Serbian musician Rambo Amadeus. It was recorded in 2002 during his concert in Skopje, Republic of Macedonia.

Track listing 
 "Bolje 1 vruće pivo nego 4 ladna"
 "Predrasude"
 "Maroko, zemljo obećana"
 "Đe si Đenis"
 "Rambovo normalno kolo"
 "Čobane vrati se"
 "Kako se zapravo pravi hit"
 "Variola Vera"
 "Ašik mlaka vodo meraklijska"
 "Otiš'o je svak ko valja"
 "Prijatelju (ispod sača)"
 "Prijatelju (sa roštilja)"
 "Kad bi sve žene na svijetu"
 "Sega mega"
 "Evribadi dens nau"
 "Ja sam robot u srcu i duši"

Bonus Tracks 
 "Motel Černobil"
 "Na ovim prostorima (Band Aid za rakiju)"

Personnel 
 Goran Ljuboja - Trut — drums
 Mihaljo Krstić - Mixajlo — bass guitar
 Ivan Aleksijević - Pančevac — keyboards
 RASMC — guitar, vocals, sampler

Notes

External links 
 Bolje jedno vruće pivo nego četri ladna on Rambo Amadeus' official web site
 Bolje jedno vruće pivo nego četri ladna on Discogs

Rambo Amadeus albums
2004 live albums